The ATS D1 was a Formula One racing car manufactured and raced by the ATS Racing Team for the last two races of the 1978 Formula One season. It was powered by a Cosworth DFV V8 engine.  Driven by Keke Rosberg, the D1 failed to finish any races in the points.

Development
The D1 was designed by John Gentry and Gustav Brunner. Designed as a wing-car, the D1 utilised an aluminium monocoque and was powered by a Cosworth DFV V8. It was intended to be a replacement for the team's poorly performing HS1 car (a modified Penske PC4 chassis) with which it had started the 1978 Formula One season.

Racing history
The HS1 with which ATS had begun the season was a poor car and the team's regular drivers Jean-Pierre Jarier and Jochen Mass had struggled to even be close to competitiveness. The D1 was first used in practice for the Dutch Grand Prix and Keke Rosberg, who had stood in for Jarier earlier in the year, used it for the last two races of the season. He placed it 15th on the grid for the United States Grand Prix but retired from the race with gearbox issues. For the last race of the year in Canada, Rosberg qualified in 21st. He finished the race but was an unclassified runner.

Complete Formula One World Championship results
(key) (Results in bold indicate pole position; results in italics indicate fastest lap)

Notes

References

ATS Formula One cars